Bojano or Boiano is a town and comune in the province of Campobasso, Molise, south-central Italy.

History
Originally named Bovianum, it was settled by the 7th century BC. As the capital of the Pentri, a tribe of the Samnites, it played a major role in the Samnite Wars, as well as in the Social War, when it was a temporary capital (89 BC). It was sacked by Sulla.

It was colonized under both the triumvirates, and by Vespasian, who settled veterans of Legio XI Claudia (whence the name Bovianum Undecumanorum, to distinguish it from Bovianum Vetus), and remained an important centre into late antiquity.

After the Lombard conquest, the deserted area was given to a group of Bulgars, who  circa 662 fled from the Avars and sought refuge with the Lombards. Bojano became a seat of a gastaldate. The Bulgars also settled in nearby Sepino and  Isernia. Paul the Deacon in his Historia Langobardorum writing after the year 787 says that in his time Bulgars still inhabited the area, and that even though they speak "Latin", "they have not forsaken the use of their own tongue". In later times they had evidently become completely assimilated.

After two centuries marked by Saracen attacks, in the mid-11th century Bojano was conquered by the Hauteville Normans, becoming a fief of Raoul de Moulins, a companion to Robert Guiscard. The city became a county capital.

The city was destroyed by a long series of earthquakes, the last occurring in 1913.

Main sights
The remains of Cyclopean walls can be seen on the heights above the modern town. Other attractions include:
The Cathedral of St. Bartholomew (11th century), several times damaged by earthquakes. The apse is still in Norman style.
The church of Sts. Erasmus and Marinus, with a noteworthy Gothic portal.
The Hermitage of St. Egidius, on a  mountain in the neighbourhood.
The remains of the Norman Castle.

Frazioni
Alifana, Campi Marzi, Castellone, Chiovitti, Ciccagne, Civita Superiore, Codacchio, Colacci, Collalto, Cucciolene, Fonte delle Felci, Imperato, Limpiilli, Majella, Malatesta, Monteverde, Mucciarone, Pallotta, Petrilli, Pietre Cadute, Pinciere, Pitoscia, Pitti, Prusciello, Rio Freddo, Santa Maria dei Rivoli, Sant'Antonio Abate, Taddeo, Tilli Tilli.

References

Sources

External links

 Official website (in Italian)
 The Battles of Bovianum, 311 BC

Cities and towns in Molise